Paula Andrea Penacca (born 27 April 1981) is an Argentine politician and social activist, who is currently a member of the Argentine Chamber of Deputies elected in the Autonomous City of Buenos Aires since 2019 for the Frente de Todos coalition. A member of the Justicialist Party and La Cámpora, Penacca previously served as a member of the Buenos Aires City Legislature from 2013 to 2019.

Early life
Penacca was born on 27 April 1981 in Zárate, Buenos Aires Province, though she has lived in the City of Buenos Aires since she was 5 years old. Her father was a sympathizer of the Radical Civic Union and of Raúl Alfonsín. She has stated that the economic hardships her family faced during the 1990s inspired her to become politically active; she began her political involvement in public schools in the villas of Buenos Aires. Following the election of Néstor Kirchner as president of Argentina in 2003, Penacca became involved in La Cámpora.

Later, she would be instrumental in the organization of La Cámpora in Villa 20, in the barrio of Lugano. She has also been active in Villa 31.

Political career
In the 2011 general election, Penacca was the 6th candidate in the Front for Victory list to the Buenos Aires City Legislature. Although the list received 14.02% of the vote and Penacca was not elected, she assumed office upon Alejandro Amor's resignation in 2013. Penacca was re-elected in 2015, this time as the second candidate in the Front for Victory list.

National Deputy
Penacca was the second candidate in the Buenos Aires City Frente de Todos list to the Argentine Chamber of Deputies in the 2019 general election, behind Fernando "Pino" Solanas; the list received 34.22% of the popular vote, and Penacca was elected. She took office on 10 December 2019.

Penacca was one of the 131 members of the Chamber of Deputies who voted in favor of the 2020 Voluntary Interruption of Pregnancy bill, which later went on to be passed by the Senate and legalize abortion in Argentina. During the debate, Penacca stated that "without [legal access to] abortion, there is no social justice".

Penacca forms part of and presides the parliamentary commission on internal security. In 2021, she presented a bill to establish a protocol against institutional violence, backed by a number of human rights activists as well as the Security Ministry.

Electoral history

References

External links

Profile on the official website of the Chamber of Deputies (in Spanish)

1981 births
Living people
People from Zárate, Buenos Aires
Politicians from Buenos Aires
21st-century Argentine politicians
21st-century Argentine women politicians
Members of the Argentine Chamber of Deputies elected in Buenos Aires
Women members of the Argentine Chamber of Deputies
Members of the Buenos Aires City Legislature
Justicialist Party politicians
Members of La Cámpora